Irene Chanter is a British singer best known for her career as a member of the Chanter Sisters and for her work as a session singer, working with a number of musicians in the 1970s and 1980s.

Irene Chanter has worked with Elton John, Long John Baldry, Phil Manzanera, Roxy Music, John Miles, Chris Farlowe, John Cale, Junior Campbell, Ron Wood, Manfred Mann's Earth Band, Baker Gurvitz Army, Caravan, Pink Floyd, The Undertones, Rod Stewart, David Coverdale, James Last, Robert Wyatt and Whitesnake. Irene Chanter has two children  and five grandchildren.

References

External links
 [ Irene Chanter's Allmusic Guide page]
 [  Chanter Sisters Allmusic Guide page]
 Chanter Sister wiki entry

Year of birth missing (living people)
Living people
British women singers
British session musicians